The Toulaman River is a river in Dominica. Its source is in the Morne Diablotins. It flows into the sea on the northeastern coast, north of Marigot.

See also
List of rivers of Dominica

References
 Map of Dominica
  GEOnet Names Server
 Water Resources Assessment of Dominica, Antigua and Barbuda, and St. Kitts and Nevis

Rivers of Dominica